The Fidesco Group is one of the first and largest retail supermarket chains in Moldova. Fidesco Group was founded in 1992. Its main activity is import and retail/wholesale of food products. The legal form of ownership is a limited company, 100% owned by private capital. Currently, the Fidesco group includes 35 stores in Chișinău, Bălți, Ialoveni, Orhei, Călărași, Căușeni, Comrat, Ceadîr-Lunga, Tvardița and Anenii Noi.

The company is managed by Galina Falo and was founded by Grigore Aizin, Mihail Aizin, Igor Chinah, Vasilii Ribacov and Oleg Tarasov.

References

External links 
 Official website

Retail companies established in 1992
Retail companies of Moldova
Companies of Moldova
1992 establishments in Moldova